Nana Osei Boateng (born 17 September 2002) is an English professional footballer who plays for Millwall, as a forward.

Career
After progressing through Millwall's academy, Boateng's first involvement in a matchday squad for the club was on 29 December 2021 in Millwall's 1–0 win away to Coventry City, where he was an unused substitute. On 8 January 2022, Boateng made his debut for Millwall, coming on as an 81st minute substitute in a 2–1 FA Cup loss against rivals Crystal Palace.

Career statistics

References

2002 births
Living people
Association football forwards
Footballers from the London Borough of Lambeth
English footballers
Millwall F.C. players
Black British sportspeople